The sixth and final season of Numbers, an American television series, first aired on September 25, 2009 and ended on March 12, 2010, on CBS. This season featured only 16 episodes.

On May 18, 2010, CBS canceled the series.

Cast 
 Rob Morrow as Don Eppes
 David Krumholtz as Charlie Eppes
 Judd Hirsch as Alan Eppes
 Alimi Ballard as David Sinclair
 Peter MacNicol as Larry Fleinhardt
 Navi Rawat as Amita Ramanujan
 Dylan Bruno as Colby Granger
 Aya Sumika as Liz Warner
 Sophina Brown as Nikki Betancourt

Episodes

References
NOTE: Refs Need Archive Backup URLs @ https://archive.org/web/

External links 
 

6
2009 American television seasons
2010 American television seasons
6